Nat(h)an Friedland was a rabbi and member of the H'bat Tsion (Coming of Zion) movement, one of the fathers of the movement for settling the Land of Israel. He grew up in Taurig, (also spelled Towrig and Tauragė) Lithuania in the early decades of the 19th century and died in Jerusalem in 1883. He became one of the most prolific Zionist writers of the H'bat Tsion movement in the mid-1800s. He was one of several writers and thinkers of the 19th century created the intellectual basis for a new Jewish state. Friedland's collected writings, including his most popular work, "Der Cos", were translated from the Yiddish to modern Hebrew. All these publications are in Hebrew except the Jewish Encyclopedia article which is in English.

Friedland was among the forerunners of Zionism in the early 19th century, including Judah ben Solomon Alkalai,  and Zvi Hirsch Kalischer who saw a messianic message in the return to Zion.

Early life and career

Rabbi Friedland grew up in the circles of Rabbi Chaim Volzien and the Vilna Gaon and his education was permeated with tradition and affection for the "Holy Land". He became imbued with a sense of a need for action in the cause for redemption. Having become a travelling preacher in synagogues in Lithuania, he made use of his speaking abilities to become the first Zionist preacher and delivered sermons in Hebrew. He began writing to circulate his ideas and became one of the most prolific Zionist writers of his time. From the day (a half century before Theodor Herzl) he realized the necessity of settling the holy land he dedicated all his time and efforts toward the execution of this idea. He became acquainted with two better known contemporaries in this endeavor, Rabbiz Zvi Kalisher and Rabbi Yehudah Alkali. He became Kalisher's faithful aide, and represented the "Corporation for Settling the Land of Israel," organized committees and collected funds (the first Zionist fund raiser) made speeches and organized propaganda for the cause.

Zionism
Friedland wanted political independence for the Land of Israel. In his opinion, once Jews settled there to redeem pieces of the land and to introduce agriculture, they would attain partial independence under the regime in place and in the course of time would become full independent. He approached the kings of France and Netherlands concerning their help in returning Jews to the land.
 
For over 30 years he was active in support of the idea of resettling Jews in then Palestine but his attempts to set up an organization were unsuccessful.

Rabbi Friedland was engaged to marry at an early age, as was custom, and moved in with his father-in-law, a scholar in Ponivar where he studied. He moved to Slant, and studied with Rabbi Zondle Slander, a student of Rabbi Chaim of Volezion. There he entered the disciple's circle of Ha Gaon from Vilna. Rabbi Zondle emigrated to Palestine in 1938.

Friedland became interested in history and current events and read German Jewish papers. The Damascus Libel, well documented in those papers, left a strong impression on him.

Friedland crystallized his views in a book, Cup of Redemption and Consolation (Cos Yishuah V' Nehemah), He believed redemption was near, but that it would be a natural one, not a miraculous one. He believed (70 years before the British were to wrest Palestine from the Turks) that an international operation would redeem the country from the Turks and turn it to the hands of the Jews. The nations would cooperate in aiding the people of Israel to return to their country because it would be their only way to escape God's further revenge and the world would not reach peace unless the Jews returned to the Land of Israel.

Friedland travelled the world meeting well known rabbis to support his views and then went to Paris and London to try and meet Cremieux and Montefiore. He met Cremieux in Paris but was unsuccessful with him. In London, he met Albert Cohen, head of charitable affairs for the Rothschild family. Here he was more successful and he wrote to Kalischer and had him send his manuscript with his views on the Land of Israel to Cohen.

He transmitted a petition, in person, to Napoleon III, concerning establishing Jewish independence in Palestine.  Napoleon responded, in a letter, that owing to political considerations with the Turks, an immediate step was impossible but as the situation changed he would act upon it. He met with the chief rabbis of France and Paris and received letters of recommendations and encouragement. He went to London and met with Moshe Montefiore who was not positive towards Friedlands' suggestions. But the chief rabbi of England, Rabbi Nathan Adler was encouraging.

Friedland returned from these travels with o substantial achievements. But soon a campaign started in the Jewish community of Frankfurt by Dr. Chaim Luria (1860) an association which collected money for Zion.
The campaign used Kalisher's pamphlet, "Drishat Zion" and Friedland's book as ways to communicate their ideas.  Lehman-Wilzig contends that Friedlands book required Kalischer's analysis to clarify it.

Dr. Luria's association eventually became defunct so Kalisher and Rabbi Eliahu Gotmacher took on the task to continue it. Friedland collaborated with Kalisher in a new edition of Kalisher's book and also wrote a new one of his own, only the last section of which was published, " So'lu S'lu Hamesila",

Later life
In 1870, though near destitute, lacking adequate money for his family, his brother's family (who had died in Jerusalem), for food, clothes and travel, he continued his writing, his travels and his campaign. Despite his very poor circumstances he published another book. And in 1871 he published a pamphlet in German: "Settling the Land of Israel." At the end of this pamphlet he wrote an essay stressing that living in the diaspora was totally unsafe since the Jews were subjugated to the whims of the local rulers.

In 1881, in London, Friedland met with a Lord Shaftsberry, head of the British Missionary Association, and a Mrs. Finn, daughter of a converted Jew and widow of a former council to Jerusalem who sought to establish an association for settling in Syria. Though too old to lead this expedition, he suggested his Michail to lead it. Michael was a rabbi and shochet who was an expert in kosher slaughter and written several books. Michael did eventually lead an expedition to Syria (Palestine) but was expelled by the Turks and landed in Cyprus where his name appears on a plaque on the synagogue he established.
Meanwhile, Friedland left with the first group of emigrants intending to get off on the Jaffa coast. He knew there was little chance the Turks would allow him to land. But with him on the ship was Karl Peter, an important Zionist leader who arranged for him to get permission to enter the country. He died in a short time in Jerusalem and is buried on Mount Olives.

References 

Year of birth unknown
1883 deaths
19th-century Lithuanian rabbis
Lithuanian Zionists
Judaism in Vilnius
Writers on Zionism
Jewish writers
History of Zionism
Emigrants from the Russian Empire to the Ottoman Empire
Forerunners of Zionism
Hovevei Zion